The F. P. Martin House (built in 1926) is a designated Municipal Heritage Property located in the Nutana, neighborhood of Saskatoon, Saskatchewan, Canada. The house was built by local architect Frank Percy Martin, in a unique Cottage Style with double dormers, Gothic doorways, and lattice windows.

F. P. Martin lived in one half of the building using the third floor loft as his study, while the second half of the house was used by his brother.

References

 

Buildings and structures in Saskatoon
Houses completed in 1926